Fred Longstaff (birth registered third ¼ 1890 – 22 July 1916) was an English professional rugby league footballer who played in the 1900s and 1910s. He played at representative level for Great Britain, England and Yorkshire, and at club level for Victoria Rangers ARLFC (in Eccleshill, Bradford), Halifax (Heritage № 166) and Huddersfield, as a forward (prior to the specialist positions of), during the era of contested scrums. He was a member of Huddersfield's 1914/15 'Team of All Talents' by winning All Four Cups available to them.

Background
Fred Longstaff's birth was registered in Bradford district, West Riding of Yorkshire, England, and he died aged 25 on 22 July 1916, fighting at the Battle of the Somme, France.  He served as a Private with the 1st/6th Bn. West Yorkshire Regiment (Prince of Wales's Own). He is buried at Blighty Valley Cemetery, Authuille Wood.

Playing career

International honours
Fred Longstaff won a cap for England while at Huddersfield in 1914 against Wales, and won caps for Great Britain while at Huddersfield in 1914 against Australia, and New Zealand.

County honours
Fred Longstaff played as a forward, i.e. number 12, and scored a try in the "Possibles" 28-15 victory over the "Probables" in the Yorkshire County Trial during the 1913–14 season at Mount Pleasant, Batley on Wednesday 1 October 1913, in front of a crowd of 2,000.

Fred Longstaff played as a forward, i.e. number 13, in Yorkshire's 3-8 defeat by Cumberland in the 1913–14 County Championship during the 1913–14 season at Lonsdale Park, Workington on Saturday 11 October 1913, in front of a crowd of 3,000, and played as a forward, i.e. number 13, and scored 2-goals in the 19-11 victory over Lancashire in the 1913–14 County Championship during the 1913–14 season at Fartown Ground, Huddersfield on Wednesday 10 December 1913, in front of a crowd of 3,500.

Championship final appearances
Longstaff played as a forward, i.e. number 11, and scored a goal in Huddersfield's 13-5 victory over Wigan in the Championship Final during the 1911–12 season at Thrum Hall, Halifax on Saturday 4 May 1912, in front of a crowd of 15,000, played as a forward, i.e. number 13, in the 29-2 victory over Wigan in the Championship Final during the 1912–13 season at Belle Vue, Wakefield on Saturday 3 May 1913, in front of a crowd of 17,000, played as a forward, i.e. number 8, in the 3-5 defeat by Salford in the Championship Final during the 1913–14 season at Headingley Rugby Stadium, Leeds on Saturday 25 April 1914, in front of a crowd of 8,091, and played as a forward, i.e. number 13, and scored a try in the 35-2 victory over Leeds in the Championship Final during the 1914–15 season at Belle Vue, Wakefield on Saturday 24 April 1915, in front of a crowd of 14,000.

Challenge Cup Final appearances
Longstaff played as a forward, i.e. number 12, in Huddersfield's 9-5 victory over Warrington in the 1912–13 Challenge Cup Final during the 1912–13 season at Headingley Rugby Stadium, Leeds on Saturday 26 April 1913, in front of a crowd of 22,754, and played as a forward, i.e. number 13, in the 37-3 victory over St. Helens in the 1914–15 Challenge Cup Final during the 1914–15 season at Watersheddings, Oldham on Saturday 1 May 1915, in front of a crowd of 8,000.

County League appearances
Fred Longstaff played in Huddersfield's victories in the Yorkshire County League during the 1911–12 season, 1912–13 season, 1913–14 season and 1914–15 season.

County Cup Final appearances
Fred Longstaff played as a forward, i.e. number 8, in Huddersfield's 19-3 victory over Bradford Northern in the 1913–14 Yorkshire County Cup Final during the 1913–14 season at Thrum Hall, Halifax on Saturday 29 November 1913, in front of a crowd of 12,000, and played as a forward, i.e. number 11, (the 2-tries that are occasionally misattributed to Fred Longstaff, were actually scored by Harold Wagstaff) in the 31-0 victory over Hull F.C. in the 1914–15 Yorkshire County Cup Final during the 1914–15 season at Headingley Rugby Stadium, Leeds on Saturday 28 November 1914, in front of a crowd of 12,000.

Club career
Fred Longstaff transferred from Victoria Rangers ARLFC to Halifax, he transferred from Halifax to Huddersfield, he made his début  for Huddersfield in the 24-3 victory over Halifax at Fartown Ground, Huddersfield on Saturday 23 December 1911, and he played his last match in the 37-3 victory over St. Helens in the 1914–15 Challenge Cup Final during the 1914–15 season at Watersheddings, Oldham on Saturday 1 May 1915, in front of a crowd of 8,000.

References

External links
Search for "Fred Longstaff" at britishnewspaperarchive.co.uk

1890 births
1916 deaths
British Army personnel of World War I
British military personnel killed in the Battle of the Somme
Burials at Blighty Valley Cemetery
England national rugby league team players
English rugby league players
Great Britain national rugby league team players
Halifax R.L.F.C. players
Huddersfield Giants players
Rugby league forwards
Military personnel from Bradford
Rugby league players from Bradford
West Yorkshire Regiment soldiers
Yorkshire rugby league team players